Harinarayan Rajbhar (born January 1, 1950) was the Member of Parliament of India from Ghosi (Lok Sabha constituency). He defeated Bahujan Samaj Party's Dara Singh Chauhan in the general election of 2014.

This was the first time that BJP had won the general election from Ghosi constituency.

After his victory, many BSP leaders joined BJP in this area.

Early life and education

Harinarayan Rajbhar was born on January 1, 1950, to Shri Bhagirathi and Smt. Kabutri. He was born in Tangunia, a village in Ballia district of Uttar Pradesh. He completed his education up to intermediate level.

Rajbhar is married to Mevati Devi.

Political career

 1991 – 1992 and 1996 – 2002: Member, Uttar Pradesh Legislative Assembly (two terms)
 1997 – 2002: Minister of State for Prison, Minor Irrigation and Rural Development, U.P. Government
 May 2014: Elected to 16th Lok Sabha
 1 Sep. 2014 - 2019: Member, Standing Committee on Science & Technology, Environment & Forests; Member, Consultative Committee, Ministry of Chemicals and Fertilizers

References

Living people
India MPs 2014–2019
People from Mau
People from Mau district
Lok Sabha members from Uttar Pradesh
Bharatiya Janata Party politicians from Uttar Pradesh
1950 births